Marijn Emmanuel Dekkers (born 22 September 1957 in Tilburg, Netherlands) is a Dutch-American former pharmaceutical businessman. He was CEO of Bayer AG from 2010 to 2016. He served as CEO of Thermo Fisher Scientific Inc. from 2002 to 2009. He served as Chairman of Unilever from 2016 to 2019. He is also Founder and Chairman of Novalis LifeSciences LLC, an investment and advisory firm for the Life Science industry.

Early life 

Dekkers grew up as the youngest of three children of a merchant in the Dutch city of Tilburg. After attending local schools, St. Aloysius (primary school) and St. Odulphus (Lyceum), in 1976 he began studying chemistry at the Radboud University in Nijmegen. Three years later he began studying chemical technology at Eindhoven University of Technology, where he received his master's degree and PhD in chemical engineering.

Career 
In 1985 Dekkers worked for General Electric (GE) in different research departments located in the US and the Netherlands. In 1988, he became Research Director of the GE range of polymers and subsequently held management positions in various other polymer units.

In 1995, Dekkers joined Allied Signal (later named Honeywell International Inc.) and took over the management of various business units.

In 2000, he became a director at the Boston-based Thermo Electron Corporation, one of the world's leading specialists in the manufacture of laboratory instruments. Within a short time, Dekkers implemented a complete corporate reorganization and became President and CEO in 2002.
In this role, he initiated further extensive restructuring measures, divesting various organizational units and strengthening the company's core business by means of targeted acquisitions, including the purchase in 2006 of the laboratory consumables supplier Fisher Scientific. After the acquisition, the company renamed as Thermo Fisher Scientific, which employed 30,000 people in six business groups.

On 1 January 2010 Dekkers was appointed to the board of Bayer AG and on 1 October 2010 he took over as CEO from Werner Wenning. On 3 June 2014 Bayer AG announced that its Supervisory Board had extended Marijn Dekkers' term as CEO by two years, on expiration of the initial five-year period. Dekkers cited family reasons for extending his contract only until the end of 2016. He left Bayer on 30 April 2016 and was succeeded by Werner Baumann on 1 May 2016.

Since April 2016 he was the Chairman of Unilever until 13 november 2019.

In 2017 Dekkers founded Novalis LifeSciences LLC, an investment and advisory firm for the Life Science industry (www.novalislifesciences.com).

In 2019 Dekkers was named Chairman of the Board of Directors of Ginkgo Bioworks, a Synthetic Biology biotech company in Boston.

Awards and recognition 

"Manager of the Year 2014" by German business magazine "Manager Magazin" 

"Business person of the Year 2015" by the "Finanzen Verlag" publishing group and the readers of its publications "€uro am Sonntag", "€uro" and "Börse online" 

"Most Innovative CEO International 2015" by the German industry's "Innovation Award"

Controversy 

In 2013 some controversy was sparked during a Financial Times panel discussion with relation to Bayer's kidney and liver cancer drug Nexavar.

He spoke at a conference in 2014, saying

Médecins Sans Frontières responded to Dekkers comment saying that it  Dekkers replied to this, referring to the decision made by the Indian government, not to protect a patent on Nexavar and the intellectual property of Bayer. He also said:

Personal life 
Dekkers holds both Dutch and U.S. citizenship.

References

External links 
 Profile at europeanceo.com

1957 births
Living people
Radboud University Nijmegen alumni
Eindhoven University of Technology alumni
Dutch chemical engineers
German chief executives
People from Tilburg